William Henry Robertson may refer to:
 William H. Robertson (1823–1898), American lawyer and politician from New York
 William Henry Robertson (physician) (1810–1897), English physician